Apterocerina is a genus of picture-winged flies in the family Ulidiidae.

Species
 Apterocerina argentea
 Apterocerina necta

References

Ulidiidae
Tephritoidea genera